The 2019–20 Algerian Cup was the 55th edition of the Algerian Cup. The tournament was suspended in March 2020 due to the COVID-19 pandemic.

Teams

National rounds

Round of 64 
The Round of 64 draw took place on 21 December and was broadcast live on Algérie 3 at 6:00 p.m local time. This round saw two matches between teams from Ligue Professionnelle 1, CS Constantine vs NC Magra and AS Ain M'lila vs JS Kabylie.

Round of 32

Round of 16 
The Round of 16 and Quarter-finals draw took place on 30 January and was broadcast live on Algérie 3 at 6:00 p.m local time.

Quarter-finals

Semi-finals

Final

Top goalscorers
As of 11 March 2020.

Note: Players and teams in bold are still active in the competition.

References

External links 

Algerian Cup
Algerian Cup
Algeria